Cicadomorpha is an infraorder of the insect order Hemiptera which contains the cicadas, leafhoppers, treehoppers, and spittlebugs. There are approximately 35,000 described species worldwide. Distributed worldwide, all members of this group are plant-feeders, and many produce either audible sounds or substrate vibrations as a form of communication.  The earliest fossils of cicadomorphs first appear during the Late Permian.

Classification
Some authors use the name Clypeorrhyncha (from the Latin clypeus and the Greek ῥύγχος rhúnkhos, 'shielded nose') as a replacement for the extant Cicadomorpha. Nymphs of many Cicadomorphans coat themselves with secretions from specialized Malphigian tubules. They are never coated with hydrophobic wax as seen in the nymphs of Fulgoromorpha. Most Cicadomorphas have a filter chamber in their mid-gut which helps remove excess water from the xylem or phloem sap that they feed on.

Of the three extant superfamilies within the Cicadomorpha, molecular phylogeny studies have placed Membracoidea as a sister group to a clade containing Cicadoidea and Cercopoidea. Within these superfamilies, not all deep phylogeny questions have been resolved.

Modified after Szwedo, 2018.

 †Infraorder Prosbolopsemorpha 
 Superfamily † Prosbolopseoidea 
 Family † Prosbolopseidae  (Permian)
 Superfamily † Pereborioidea 
 † Curvicubitidae  (Triassic) 
 † Ignotalidae  (Permian-Triassic) 
 † Pereboriidae  (Permian-Triassic) 
 Superfamily †Dysmorphoptiloidea 
 †Dysmorphoptilidae  (Permian- Jurassic)
 †Eoscarterellidae  (Permian-Triassic)
 †Magnacicadiidae  (Triassic)
 Superfamily † Palaeontinoidea 
 † Dunstaniidae  (Permian–Jurassic)
 † Mesogereonidae  (Triassic)
 † Palaeontinidae  (Triassic–Cretaceous)
 Superfamily † Hylicelloidea 
 † Chiliocyclidae ; Triassic
 † Hylicellidae  (Triassic–Cretaceous)
 † Mesojabloniidae  (Triassic)
 Clade Clypeata 
 Superfamily Cercopoidea 
 Superfamily Cicadoidea 
 Superfamily †Hylicelloidea 
 † Chiliocyclidae ; Triassic
 † Hylicellidae  (Triassic–Cretaceous)
 † Mesojabloniidae  (Triassic)
 † Minlagerrontidae  (Cretaceous)
 Superfamily Membracoidea

References

 
Auchenorrhyncha
Insect infraorders